Azul y Negro is a Spanish synthpop music duo that was founded in 1981 by Carlos García-Vaso, a multi instrumentalist, songwriter and producer, and Joaquín Montoya: (b. 1950 Cartagena).

Career
Azul y Negro were pioneers of synth and electropop in Spain. The debut album La Edad De Los Colores was released in 1981. The year after the album La Noche (The Night) was released, followed by the better known Digital. An international chart release, it was an instant chart success. The single "Me Estoy Volviendo Loco" (meaning Going Crazy) taken from the album became a hit in Europe, Japan, United States and Australia. Digital, a collection from the first two albums, included songs like "No Tengo Tiempo", "La Torre de Madrid", "La Noche (Let's Spend the night together)".

Discography
1981: La Edad de Los Colores
1982: La Noche
1982: Isadora
1983: Digital
1984: Suspense
1985: Mercado Común
1986: Babel
1993: De Vuelta al Futuro
1996: De Vuelta al Futuro II
2002: Recuerda
2002: Mare Nostrum
2003: ISS (Incursión Sonora Surround) (2 versions)
2005: VOX
2005: El Color de los Éxitos
2007: Makes Me Happy
2008: Déjà Vu
2009: Retrospective
2011: Vision
2012: Crystalline World
2014: Silencio de Metal
2015: Locations
2016: Dicromo (1981–1986)

References

External links
Official Azul y Negro Site
Joaquín Montoya Official website
Last.fm page

Spanish pop music groups